Baseball at the 2019 Pan American Games  was held from July 27 to August 4. The venue for the competition was the baseball stadium located at the Villa María del Triunfo cluster. The tournament was part of the 2019 edition of the Pan American Games, hosted by Lima, Peru.

A total of eight men's teams (each consisting of up to 24 players) competed. Thus, a total of 192 athletes were scheduled to compete. After having been contested for the first time in 2015, women's baseball was dropped for this edition.

Puerto Rico won the gold medal game over Canada, 6–1, and were undefeated during the tournament. Nicaragua finished in third place.

The top finishers in the event that were not already qualified for the 2019 WBSC Premier12 were awarded the final one or two spots (depending on other qualification paths) in the Americas Qualifying Event for the 2020 Summer Olympics in Tokyo. Nicaragua and Colombia so qualified for the Americas Qualifying Event via their third-place and fourth-place finishes.

Medalists

Participating nations

A total of 8 countries qualified baseball teams.

Qualification
Eight men's teams qualified to compete at the games in each tournament. The host nation (Peru) qualified in each tournament, along with winner of the South American Championship, the top two teams at the 2018 Central American and Caribbean Games and the top four teams at the Pan American Qualification tournament.

Competition format
The eight teams were split into groups of four, with the top two teams in each group advancing to the "super round". The third placed team in each group played for fifth place, while fourth in each group played for seventh. In the super round, each team played the two teams from the other group, with the result against the team from its group carried over. The top two in this round played for gold, with the other two teams playing for bronze.

Results
All times are Peru Standard Time (UTC−5)

Preliminary round

Group A

Group B

Placement matches

Seventh place match

Fifth place match

Super round

Medal matches

Bronze medal match

Gold medal match

Final standings

See also
 Baseball at the 2020 Summer Olympics

References

External links
Results book

 
Baseball
Baseball
Pan American Games
2019 Pan American Games